Kelowna City Council is the governing body of the city of Kelowna, British Columbia, Canada. The council consist of the mayor and eight elected city councillors who represent the city. Municipal elections are held every four years across the Province on the third Saturday of November.

2022–present
Elected in the 2022 municipal elections
Mayor: Tom Dyas 
Councillors: Charlie Hodge, Mohini Singh, Maxine DeHart, Luke Stack, Loyal Wooldridge, Ron Cannan, Rick Webber, Gord Lovegrove

2018-2022
 Vote Results
Mayor: Colin Basran
Councillors: Charlie Hodge, Mohini Singh, Ryan Donn, Gail Given, Maxine DeHart, Brad Sieben, Luke Stack, Loyal Wooldridge

2014-2018
 Vote Results
Mayor: Colin Basran
Councillors: Charlie Hodge, Mohini Singh, Ryan Donn, Gail Given, Maxine DeHart, Brad Sieben, Tracy Gray, Luke Stack

2011-2014
Mayor: Walter Gray
Councillors: Robert Hobson, Gail Given, Colin Basran, Andre Blanleil, Luke Stack, Mohini Singh, Maxine DeHart, Gerry Zimmermann.

2008-2011

 Vote Results
Mayor: Sharon Shepherd
Councillors: Robert Hobson, Brian Given, Andre Blanleil, Angela Reid, Michele Rule, Graeme James, Luke Stack, Charlie Hodge.

 As of the November 2009 by-election; Kevin Craig has replaced Brian Given.
By-Election Results

2005-2008

 Vote Results
 Mayor: Sharon Shepherd
 Councillors: Robert Hobson, Brian Given, Carol Gran, Michele Rule, Colin Day, Andre Blanleil, Norm Letnick, Barrie Clark

2002-2005

 Vote Results
 Mayor: Walter Gray
 Councillors: Robert Hobson, Brian Given, Al Horning, Ron Cannan, Colin Day, Andre Blanleil, Sharon Shepherd, Barrie Clarke.

1999-2002
Mayor: Walter Gray
Councillors: Robert Hobson, Brian Given, Ron Cannan, Colin Day, Andre Blanleil, Sharon Shepherd, Smiley Nelson.

1996-1999
Mayor: Walter Gray
Councillors: Robert Hobson, Joe Leask, Ron Cannan, Colin Day, Andre Blanleil, Sharon Shepherd, Smiley Nelson, Marion Bremner.

1993-1996
Mayor: James Stuart
Councillors: Robert Hobson, Colin Day, Andre Blanleil, Joe Leask, Ben Lee, Henry Markgraf, Shirley Staley, Marion Bremner.

1988-1993
Mayor: James Stuart
Councillors: Robert Hobson, Marion Bremner. Further Councillors Unknown.

References

External links
City of Kelowna

Municipal councils in British Columbia
Politics of Kelowna